Cameron McRae Winslow (July 29, 1854 – January 2, 1932) served in the United States Navy during the Spanish–American War and World War I. A son of Commander Francis Winslow (I) (1818–1862), (Cameron's father, who also fought in the Civil War, and died of yellow fever in 1862 while in command of , was a first cousin of John A. Winslow.)

Early life 
Cameron McRae Winslow was born in Washington, D.C.  He was the son of Francis Winslow (1819–1862) and Mary Sophia (née Nelson) Winslow (1828–1903). His older brother was Lieutenant Francis Winslow (II) USN; his younger brother, Arthur Winslow, was the grandfather of the Pulitzer Prize-winning poet Robert Lowell. He graduated from the United States Naval Academy in 1874, after which followed years of extensive sea duty.

Winslow was the great great great grandson of Major General John Stark, a distinguished soldier from New Hampshire during the American Revolution. In 1915 he joined the New Hampshire Society of the Cincinnati with General Stark as his propositus.

Naval career
During the 1898 war with Spain, then Lieutenant Winslow served on board the gunboat . Despite enemy fire from point-blank range, which resulted in a bullet wound to his hand, Winslow retained command throughout the engagement. At that time, regulations did not allow Navy officers to receive the Medal of Honor. However, all the enlisted sailors involved in the cable cutting operation did receive the Medal of Honor.

Winslow commanded  from 1905 to 1907 and battleship  from 1908 to 1909. Winslow did not sail on the around-the-world cruise of the Great White Fleet. When the fleet returned to the US in 1909, Winslow and New Hampshire joined the fleet for its formal military review before President Roosevelt.

Promoted to rear admiral on September 14, 1911, Winslow was Commander in Chief, United States Pacific Fleet, from September 13, 1915 until July 29, 1916 when he was retired due to reaching the statutory age limit of 62. (While in command of the Pacific Fleet, he held four-star Admiral rank pursuant to a 1915 law that designated holders of certain commands to temporary 4-star rank; see List of United States Navy four-star admirals.)

Winslow was recalled to active duty in World War I with the rank of rear admiral. He served as Inspector of Naval Districts on the Atlantic coast until again retiring on November 11, 1919.

Retirement
Following the 1908 death of his oldest brother, Lt. Francis Winslow (II) USN, Rear Admiral Winslow became a member of the Society of the Cincinnati in the State of New Hampshire, representing his direct ancestor Major General John Stark. The admiral's younger brother, Arthur Winslow, also joined the Society, representing the General's oldest son, Major Caleb Stark.

Winslow was also a member of the Military Order of Foreign Wars and the Naval Order of the United States.

Personal life
He was married to Theodora Havemeyer (1878–1945), one of nine children born to sugar baron Theodore A. Havemeyer and Emilie (née de Loosey) Havemeyer.  Theodora was the sister of Charles Frederick Havemeyer.  Together, they were the parents of six children, three sons and three daughters, including:

 Cameron McRae Winslow, Jr. (1901–1981), who graduated from the United States Naval Academy in 1924.  Winslow, Jr. received the Navy Cross for heroism while in command of the armed guard on board the S.S. Chi Ping from March 12 to March 14, 1930, on the Yangtze River, near Ichang, China. While moving on the river, the vessel was taken under heavy fire on several occasions from Chinese soldiers.  Winslow returned fire promptly so that in each instance the attack was repulsed and the vessel permitted to continue its voyage. During an attack on 14 March, Winslow was struck in the thigh by a rifle bullet. He did not give up command of his detachment but continued firing a machine gun.  In 1932 he succeeded his father as a hereditary member of the New Hampshire Society of the Cincinnati.  He served in the early years of World War II and was retired from the Navy for medical reasons on April 1, 1943 with the rank of lieutenant commander.  In retirement he lived in Newport, Rhode Island.
 Theodora Marie Winslow (1903–2007), who married Auguste Louis Noel (1884–1964), a Beaux-Arts architect.  Their daughter, Carlotta Marie Noel, was married to Peter Van Courtlandt Morris (b. 1931), the son of Newbold Morris, president of the New York City Council.
 Arthur Winslow (1913–1987), who married Jean Douglas (1921–1951) in 1948.

Admiral Winslow died at his home, 205 Commonwealth Avenue in Boston, Massachusetts, on January 2, 1932.

Legacy
The first two ships named  honored his cousin, Rear Admiral John Ancrum Winslow, and  honored Rear Admiral Cameron McRae Winslow as well.

Admiral Winslow's full dress uniform is on display at the Artillery Company of Newport armory and museum in Newport, Rhode Island.

Awards
 Sampson Medal
 Spanish Campaign Medal
 Mexican Service Medal
 World War I Victory Medal

Dates of rank
 Midshipman – 29 September 1870
 Passed Midshipman – 21 June 1875
 Ensign – 18 July 1876
 Master – 21 December 1881
 Lieutenant, Junior Grade – 3 March 1883
 Lieutenant – 1 July 1888
 Lieutenant Commander – 3 March 1899
 Commander – 11 October 1903
 Captain – 28 January 1908
 Rear Admiral – 14 September 1911
 Admiral – 13 September 1915
 Retired – 29 July 1916

See also
 Bibliography of early American naval history

References

External links

1854 births
1932 deaths
United States Navy personnel of World War I
American military personnel of the Spanish–American War
United States Naval Academy alumni
United States Navy admirals
People from Washington, D.C.